Green Creek, Greens Creek or Green's Creek may refer to:

In Canada
Green Creek, Nova Scotia, a small community
Green's Creek (Ontario), a tributary of the Ottawa River

In the United States
 Greens Creek mine, Alaska
Greens Creek (Meramec River), stream in Missouri, a tributary of the Meramec River
Green Creek, New Jersey, an unincorporated community
Green Creek Township, Sandusky County, Ohio
Green Creek (Ohio), a tributary of the Sandusky River
Green Creek, Ohio, an unincorporated community
Green Creek (Fishing Creek), a stream in Pennsylvania

See also
Green Valley Creek, a stream in Sonoma County, California
Green River (disambiguation)